Eimantas is a Lithuanian masculine given name. Individuals with the name Eimantas include:
Eimantas Bendžius (born 1990), Lithuanian basketball player
Eimantas Grakauskas (born 1947), Lithuanian jurist and politician
Eimantas Poderis (born 1973), Lithuanian footballer
Eimantas Stanionis (born 1994), Lithuanian boxer

References

Lithuanian masculine given names